Herzliya is a city on the central coast of Israel.

Herzliya, Herzlia or Herzliah may also refer to:

 Herzliah High School, a high school in Montreal, Canada
 Herzliya Hebrew High School, a high school in Tel Aviv, Israel
 United Herzlia Schools, Jewish day-school in Cape Town, South Africa